Night Plane from Chungking (also known as China Pass and Sky Over China) is a 1943 American war film released by Paramount Pictures, directed by Ralph Murphy, and produced by Michael Kraike and Walter MacEwen from a screenplay by Lester Cole, Earl Fenton and Theodore Reeves, adapted by Sidney Biddell from the 1931 story by Harry Hervey. The film stars Robert Preston and Ellen Drew, with Otto Kruger and Stephen Geray.

Night Plane from Chungking was a remake of Paramount's earlier film Shanghai Express (1932). The film was remade as Peking Express (1951).

Plot
In 1942, during the Japanese invasion of China, due to the carelessness of one of the passengers, Albert Pasavy (Otto Kruger), draws attention from Japanese bombers overhead, to a bus travelling to India along a muddy road.  The Japanese bomb the road, hitting a munitions truck carrying Chinese troops. The Chinese officer in charge, demands his wounded be put on the bus and brought to a secret air field. Among the stranded passengers met by U.S. pilot Nick Stanton (Robert Preston), are a beautiful Red Cross nurse, Ann Richards (Ellen Drew), and her traveling companion, Madame Wu (Soo Yong), who is on a secret diplomatic mission. There is also Countess Olga Karagin (Tamara Geva), who is caught spying.

Nick and his co-pilot, Captain Po (Victor Sen Yung), are ordered to fly the remainder of the passengers out to safety in India, but the transport aircraft is intercepted by Japanese fighter aircraft and shot down. Nick makes an emergency landing in a jungle. Over the radio, Nick learns that Olga has committed suicide, but the spy was trying to get top-secret information to her superior, who is still among the passengers.

Another of the passengers, Doctor Van der Linden (Stephen Geray), goes missing, but returns with food he claims comes from a nearby monastery. The doctor leads everyone on a long hike to the monastery, only to reveal there that he is a Nazi collaborator working with the Japanese. He demands to know where Olga is, not knowing she is dead. All the survivors are captured and held at the monastery.

It is up to Nick to try to come up with an escape plan. He convinces Van Der Linden to allow Po to repair the aircraft and to allow the hostages to be exchanged for Olga. A coded message is sent to Nick's headquarters, but the Nazi soon finds out that Olga is already dead. After Pasavy betrays the others and is coldly shot, Nick kills Van der Linden. With Japanese troops in pursuit, Major Raoul Brissac (Ernest Dorian) sacrifices himself to save the others by pulling the pin on a grenade, killing himself along with the Japanese. Nick, Po, Ann and Madame Wu then fly to safety. Having fallen in love, Nick and Ann vow to reunite after the war.

Cast

 Robert Preston as Captain Nick Stanton
 Ellen Drew as Ann Richards
 Stephen Geray as Doctor Ven Der Lieden
 Otto Kruger as Albert Pasavy
 Victor Sen Yung as Captain Po
 Tamara Geva as Countess Olga Karagin
 Soo Yong as Madame Wu
 Ernest Dorian as Major Raoul Brissac
 Angel Cruz as Japanese soldier
 Allen Jung as Lieutenant Tang
 Leonard Strong as Lieutenant Karuma
 Lee Tung Foo as Bus driver

Production
Principal photography on Night Plane from Chungking took place from mid-August to September 11, 1942.

Reception
In his review for The New York Times, Thomas Pryor noted that Night Plane from Chungking made an attempt to be topical. "For this is another in the growing list of Hollywood melodramatic exercises in which the war is dragged in simply to give an old story formula a semblance of freshness. In this case Paramount even stretched a point in labeling the film 'Night Plane From Chungking', for it is by the merest of coincidences that the characters get aboard a transport plane on their way to the Indian frontier, and at that they are quickly shot down by a squadron of Japs."

Film historian Alun Evans in Brassey's Guide to War Films, considered Night Plane from Chungking "just another variant on 'Shanghair Expres', this time in the air."

References

Bibliography
 Evans, Alun. Brassey's Guide to War Films. Dulles, Virginia: Potomac Books, 2000. .

External links 
 
 
 
 

1940s war drama films
Paramount Pictures films
American black-and-white films
Remakes of American films
American aviation films
Films directed by Ralph Murphy
Films set in China
Second Sino-Japanese War films
American war drama films
1943 drama films
1943 films
1940s English-language films
1940s American films